Lekshmipuram College of Arts and Science, is a general degree college located in Lekshmipuram, Kanyakumari district, Tamil Nadu. It was established in 1964. The college is affiliated with Manonmaniam Sundaranar University. It is nationally accredited by NAAC with 'B' grade. The college offers courses in arts, commerce and science.

Departments

Arts and Commerce
Tamil
English
Malayalam
History
Economics
Political Science
Commerce

Science
Physics
Chemistry
Mathematics
Botany
Zoology
Information Technology
Electronics
Biochemistry
Costume Design and fashion Technology
Library and Information Science
Physical Education

UGC Career Oriented Programmes
certificates/Diplomo/Advanced Diplomo in:
Journalism & Medicinal Plants

UG Courses
Aided courses:

B.A.Tamil literature
B.A.English literature
B.A.History and Tourism (English medium)
B.A.History and Tourism (Tamil Medium)
B.Sc.Mathematics
B.Sc.Physics
B.Sc.Zoology

Self-financing courses:

B.A.English Literature
B.Com.Computer Application
B.Sc.Mathematics
B.Sc.Information Technology
B.Sc.Electronics
B.Sc.Bio-Chemistry
B.Sc.Costume Design and Fashion Technology

PG Courses
M.A.Tamil Literature
M.A.English Literature
M.A.History
M.Com.Computer Application (#)
M.Sc.Mathematics  
M.Sc.Physics
M.Sc.Information Technology (#)
M.Sc.Bio-Chemistry  (#)

(#) Temporarily Course Stopped

Facilities
 Canteen
 PCO, Fax, Photocopying, E-mail &   Internet browsing.
 Book Store (Textbook, notebooks, record books, stationary, sweets, biscuits, cakes, cool drinks, water bottles etc. are available)

M.Phil and Ph.D Programmes
M.Phil.Tamil
M.Phil.English
M.Phil.History
M.Phil.Mathematics
Ph.D.Research centre-Tamil
Ph.D.Research centre-English

Co-curricular activities
College Union 
English Literary Association 
Tamil Mantram
Malayala Samajam
Mathematics Association 
Physics Association 
Biology Association 
History, Economics & Politics Association 
Fine Arts Association 
Youth Welfare
Youth Red Cross
Red Ribbon Club
Citizens Consumer Club
Ilayor Avai
Eco Club

Other activities
 NCC-National Cadet Corps
 NSS-National Service Scheme
 YRC-Youth Red Cross
 Physical Education

Various committees of the college
College Union
Alumni Association 
Parent Teacher Association 
Internal Quality Assurance Cell
Admission Committee
Discipline Committee
Anti-Eve Teasing Committee
Anti-Ragging Committee
Women Cell
Students Union- Advisory Committee
Career Guidance Cell
Placement Cell
Grievances Redressal Committee
Free Noon Meal Scheme Committee
Human Resources Development Cell
Campus Amenity Committee
Student Magazine
Health Practices
Library Committee
Book Review Club
College Record Bureau
Quiz Club
Cultural Committee
Audio Video Club
Photography Club
SC/ST Welfare Committee
Debate Club and Essay Writing
Remedial Programme
Nature club
College Greening Club
Eco Club
Health Club
Trekking Club
Information Communication Technology Cell
Consumer Club
Lekshmi Research Club
College News Letter
Model Examination Committee
Sports Committee

Accreditation
The college is  recognized by the University Grants Commission (UGC).

References

External links
http://www.lpc.org.in

Educational institutions established in 1964
1964 establishments in Madras State
Colleges affiliated to Manonmaniam Sundaranar University
Universities and colleges in Kanyakumari district